Grossenbacher Nunatak is a nunatak at the southwest end of the Lyon Nunataks, Palmer Land, Antarctica,  southwest of Holtet Nunatak. It was named by the Advisory Committee on Antarctic Names after Ernest P. Grossenbacher, an upper atmospheric physicist at Siple Station, 1970–71.

References

Nunataks of Palmer Land